Kalegah-e Zaman (also Romanized as Kalegāh-e Zamān and Kalgāh-e Zamān; also known as Kalgah, Kalgāh, and Kalgeh) is a village in Bavaleh Rural District, in the Central District of Sonqor County, Kermanshah Province, Iran. At the 2006 census, its population was 837, in 165 families.

References 

Populated places in Sonqor County